A Couch in New York is a 1996 romantic comedy film co-written and directed by Chantal Akerman. The plot centers on an anonymous exchange of apartments between a successful New York psychoanalyst (William Hurt) and a young woman from Paris (Juliette Binoche).

Plot
Henry Harriston is a psychoanalyst whose patients are driving him crazy by constantly leaving him messages during his off hours. On a whim he places an ad offering up his apartment for a housing swap. Béatrice Saulnier (Juliette Binoche) a Parisian dancer responds to his ad and without meeting the two switch apartments. Béatrice is impressed with Henry's high-tech apartment which is both beautiful and spacious. Henry meanwhile is horrified when he arrives in Béatrice's apartment and finds it filthy and messy.

Meanwhile, Henry's patients, who Henry sees at home, begin coming to his apartment seeking therapy. Béatrice begins listening to their stories, and the patients accept her as Henry's temporary replacement.

At Béatrice's apartment Henry discovers a cache of love-letters written to Béatrice by various men. Béatrice's lovers also begin showing up in her apartment and talking to Henry about their love for her. When they begin calling the apartment telling Henry how helpful he was and how they want to talk to him again he turns tail and returns to New York.

Originally intending to simply pick up his mail, Henry notices that his patients keep coming in and out of his apartment and, when he tries to enter his apartment, is pushed out by Béatrice's friend who is posing as her receptionist. Believing that Béatrice is intentionally running a scam, he goes to confront her, posing as a fake patient, John. Instead of confronting her however, he keeps up the ruse of being a patient, but is unable to talk and the session consists of Béatrice and Henry saying "Yes" back and forth at one another. Despite this, the two find themselves attracted to one another and the session ends with Béatrice suggesting that Henry, as John, come back. Henry meanwhile is convinced that Béatrice really does mean well and decides to keep up the ruse and continue seeing her.

After a particular session in which Henry talks about his distant relationship with his mother, both Henry and Béatrice begin to think they've fallen in love with one another. Henry refuses to say anything, feeling too cowardly, while Béatrice's friend tells her she cannot be involved in a relationship with a patient. Béatrice and Henry become close and continue to feel strongly towards one another. During one of their sessions the light turns off and both secretly whisper love confessions in the dark, but neither hears what the other is saying. Henry's friend urges him to run to Béatrice or write her a letter but as these are all things that Béatrice's previous lovers have done that have failed, Henry refuses. He decides that the only way the situation will be resolved is if Béatrice confesses her love to him. Instead she calls him late at night to tell him their sessions must come to an end as she is returning to Paris. Henry tells Béatrice he loves her, but she hangs up before she hears what he has said.

Henry rushes to the airport hoping to get a last minute flight to Paris. Unfortunately, the plane is overbooked. Henry decides to wait on standby. He is able to get the last ticket as one passenger has not shown up, however that ticket belonged to Béatrice, so while Henry flies to Paris, searching the plane, looking for Béatrice, Béatrice stays behind.

Eventually arriving home, Béatrice realizes she cannot go to her apart as Henry is still in her apartment and goes to stay with her neighbour. On her neighbour's terrace she sees her plants which have flourished in her absence. She strikes up a conversation with Henry, who she cannot see through the plants. He disguises his voice so she will not recognize him. Talking to Henry through the plants Béatrice confesses that she came early because she had fallen in love with one of Henry's patients, John.

Realizing that Henry and John are one and the same person, Béatrice climbs over the terrace back into her apartment and kisses Henry, telling him she loves him.

Cast
 Juliette Binoche as Béatrice Saulnier
 William Hurt as Henry Harriston
 Stephanie Buttle as Anne
 Barbara Garrick as Lizbeth Honeywell
 Paul Guilfoyle as Dennis
 Richard Jenkins as Campton
 Kent Broadhurst as Tim
 Matthew Burton as Wood
 Henry Bean as Stein
 Bernard Breuse as Jérôme
 Adam LeFevre as restaurant patron
 Boris Leskin as cab driver #1
 Tiffany Frazer as Julie
 Wendy Way as employee at airport
 Jerry Dean as cab driver #2

Reception
The film received unfavourable reviews upon release. Akerman, Binoche and Hurt were criticised for being poor at handling both the comedic and romantic aspects of the film.

References

External links
 
 
 

1996 films
1996 multilingual films
1996 romantic comedy films
1990s English-language films
1990s French films
1990s French-language films
1990s German films
Belgian multilingual films
Belgian romantic comedy films
English-language Belgian films
English-language French films
English-language German films
Films directed by Chantal Akerman
Films about psychoanalysis
Films set in New York City
Films set in Paris
Films shot in New York City
Films shot in Paris
Foreign films set in the United States
French multilingual films
French romantic comedy films
French-language Belgian films
French-language German films
German multilingual films
German romantic comedy films